Coláiste San Dominic is a camogie club that won the Dublin Senior championship on several occasions. Coláiste San Dominic wore a navy gym tunic with a dark blue and white checked blouse.

Notable players
Notable players include Pat Rafferty (later to become a President of the Camogie Association) and All Ireland Camogie Championship winning captains Peggy Griffin and Pat Raftery.

References

Camogie clubs in County Dublin